Yugoslav Black Wave (also referred to as Black Wave;  or ) is a blanket term for a Yugoslav film movement of the 1960s and early 1970s. Notable directors include Dušan Makavejev, Žika Pavlović, Aleksandar Petrović, Želimir Žilnik, Mika Antić, Lordan Zafranović, Mića Popović and Marko Babac. Their films are known for their non-traditional approach to film making, their dark humor and their critical examination of the Yugoslav society at the time.

History
In the early 1960s Yugoslavia produced more films than ever before. Exports soared during this period of intense creativity and experimentation. The filmmakers were linked by a common wish to increase the freedom of artistic expression, and to reform the cinematic language. The filmmakers wanted the right to show the darker side of the human psyche and to openly criticize the policy of the socialist state. This stream gained international attention as well as provoking strong controversies within Yugoslavia. The liberalization of the film form and expression reached its apex in 1967–68. 

In the following years, the counter-offensive against the new movement intensified. Black films were attacked for their pessimistic view on the Yugoslav socialist development and liberalism in general, as well as their valorization of anarchistic and individualistic tendencies in the society. The attacks on the movement can be seen as a natural result of the broader political developments at the time. Eventually it led to the banning of selected films and some directors were forced to leave the country.

Notable individuals and films
Dušan Makavejev is considered the leader of the Black Wave filmmakers. His most successful film was the 1971 political satire  WR: Mysteries of the Organism, which he directed and wrote. The film was banned, and Makavejev fled the country, not working there again until 1988. He made Sweet Movie in Canada, the Netherlands, and France.

Aleksandar "Saša" Petrović was another of the major figures of the Yugoslav Black Wave. He made the movement well known in Yugoslavia and abroad. Two of his works were nominated for the Academy Award for Best Foreign Language Film: Three in 1966 and I Even Met Happy Gypsies (Feather Gatherers) in 1967.

Želimir Žilnik's Early Works (1969) showed the main tendencies of the Yugoslav Black Wave: nonordinary forms, polemical methods, socio-critical concerns, oppositional ideology and a fatalistic final. At the same time, it prompted the writer and journalist Vladimir Jovičić (who insisted on the position of the traditional communist party line) to write an article "The Black Wave in Our Cinema" (Crni talas u našem filmu), published in Borba on August 3, 1969, which coined the very term "Black Wave". The official counterattack against the Yugoslav Black Wave began with this film and this article.

Although the best directors and movies of the Black Wave were Serbian, the Croatian Cinema was also a party to this process. The most important black wave classic from Croatia is Handcuffs (Lisice, 1969, by Krsto Papić), first art product showing secrets of the breakup between Josip Broz Tito and Joseph Stalin in 1948.

Accolades and legacy
The wave is one of the most successful and internationally recognized cinematic movements of Southeast Europe, besides Romanian New Wave of 2000s. Films from the wave won a plethora of international recognition, including a Golden Bear, Silver Bear for Best Director,  Cannes Grand Prix, six nominations for  Cannes Palme d'Or and four nominations for Academy Award for Best International Feature Film, with success continuing through directors emerging from the wave, including two Palme d'Or awards in 1980s and 1990s. Today, several of the films are considered classics of world cinema and were released as part of influential collections such as Criterion Collection in the United States.

See also
 Czech New Wave
 Extreme cinema
 Counterculture of the 1960s

Notes

Sources

Further reading
 
 

Movements in cinema
1960s in film
1970s in film
Cinema of Yugoslavia
1960s in Yugoslavia
1970s in Yugoslavia